Manoel Braga (31 March 1902 – 7 June 1955) was a Brazilian sports shooter. He competed at the 1932, 1936 and 1948 Summer Olympics.

References

External links
 

1902 births
1955 deaths
Brazilian male sport shooters
Olympic shooters of Brazil
Shooters at the 1932 Summer Olympics
Shooters at the 1936 Summer Olympics
Shooters at the 1948 Summer Olympics
Sportspeople from Rio de Janeiro (city)
20th-century Brazilian people